The  is a gallery of photography in the Kiyosato region
of the city of Hokuto, Yamanashi (Japan).

The gallery was founded in 1995; Eikoh Hosoe has been its director since its opening.

The gallery, which also refers to itself as "K*MoPA", "embraces photographic art made in the affirmation of life"; this does not exclude harsh images. It attempts to acquire prints of archival quality, and is particularly keen to encourage younger photographers to submit their work for consideration. The work of young photographers that the gallery accepts is exhibited in an annual series of "Young Portfolio" exhibitions, perhaps inspired by a major opening exhibition in which twenty-five well-established Japanese photographers exhibited work that they had done while still in their twenties.

Exhibitions have generally been thematic, but photographers with solo retrospectives have included Manuel Álvarez Bravo, Shisei Kuwabara and others. Exhibition catalogues are available directly from the museum.

The closest station to the gallery is Kiyosato Station, on the Koumi Line.

Notes

References

Further reading
25nin no 20dai no shashin / Works by 25 Photographers in their 20s. Kiyosato Museum of Photographic Arts exhibition catalogue, 1995. Parallel texts in Japanese and English.

External links
 Museum website

Art museums established in 1995
Photography museums and galleries in Japan
Museums in Yamanashi Prefecture
1995 establishments in Japan
Hokuto, Yamanashi